The 2012 AON Open Challenger was a professional tennis tournament played on clay courts. It was the ninth edition of the tournament which was part of the 2012 ATP Challenger Tour. It took place in Genoa, Italy between 3 and 9 September 2012.

Singles main draw entrants

Seeds

 1 Rankings are as of August 27, 2012.

Other entrants
The following players received wildcards into the singles main draw:
  Fabio Fognini
  Frederik Nielsen
  Lukáš Rosol
  Andreas Seppi

The following players received entry from the qualifying draw:
  Andre Begemann
  Alberto Brizzi
  Marco Crugnola
  Renzo Olivo

Champions

Singles

 Albert Montañés def.  Tommy Robredo, 6–4, 6–1

Doubles

 Andre Begemann /  Martin Emmrich def.  Dominik Meffert /  Philipp Oswald, 6–3, 6–1

External links
Official Website

AON Open Challenger
AON Open Challenger
September 2012 sports events in Italy
21st century in Genoa
2012 in Italian tennis